Seriolella is a genus of medusafishes native to the southwestern Pacific Ocean and the eastern Indian Ocean.

Species
There are currently six recognized species in this genus:
 Seriolella brama (Günther, 1860) (Blue warehou or common warehou)
 Seriolella caerulea Guichenot, 1848 (White warehou)
 Seriolella porosa Guichenot, 1848 (Choicy ruff)
 Seriolella punctata (J. R. Forster, 1801) (Silver warehou)
 Seriolella tinro Gavrilov, 1973
 Seriolella violacea Guichenot, 1848 (Palm ruff)

References

Centrolophidae